Miko Golubovic (born June 21, 1982) is a Montenegrin professional basketball player who last played for Pelister of the Macedonian First League (basketball). He also holds Macedonian citizenship.

References

External links
 Profile at basketball.realgm.com
 Profile at fiba.com
 Profile at eurobasket.com

1982 births
Living people
BC Rilski Sportist players
CS Energia Rovinari players
KK Napredak Kruševac players
KK Spartak Subotica players
Montenegrin expatriate basketball people in Serbia
Montenegrin men's basketball players
Centers (basketball)